A. C. Zainuddin (12 May 1952 – 4 November 1999) was an Indian actor, assistant director and comedian, who worked in Malayalam cinema.

Career
He started his career as a mimicry artist in Cochin Kalabhavan. He was expert in imitating actor Madhu, especially his mannerisms as Pareekkutty in Chemmeen. He first appeared in films like Chappa directed by P. A. Bakkar. He then went on to act in over 150 films in a span of 13 years from 1986 to 1999. He was noted for his role as a Siamese twin in the film Siamese Irattakal, which featured him as a conjoined twin to Maniyanpilla Raju. Zainuddin also excelled in his roles in Mimics Parade, Hitler, Kabooliwala, Lal Salaam, Kasargode Khaderbhai and Alanchery Thambrakkal. By the late of 1990s, he started to suffer from respiratory diseases. Sainudheen was a member of a stage programme organised by Association of Malayalam Movie Artists (AMMA) to raise funds for the families of deceased in the Kargil war of 1999, which happened to be his last stage programme. He died of respiratory complications at a private hospital in Kochi on 4 November 1999. He was only 47 at the time of his death. His last credited role was in the film  Ezhupunna Tharakan.

Personal life

Zainuddin was married to Laila in 1982 who was working as a Hindi teacher in GVHSS, and they have two sons Zinsil and Zinil. Zinsil completed his M.B.A. He married Anfiya and he has tried his luck in a Malayalam movie, Puthumukhangal. Zinil completed his graduation in computer engineering. Zinil Zainudheen marked his acting debut in the 2014 Malayalam movie To let Ambadi Talkies along with Arjun Ashok (son of Harisree Ashokan, who is the great friend of Zainuddin).

Filmography

My Dear Kuttichathan (1984) as Barman
Chappa (1982) as Vasu
Pappan Priyappetta Pappan (1986)
Onnu Muthal Poojyam Vare (1986) as Santa Claus
Chaanakyan (1989)
Indrajaalam (1990) as Kuttan
Shubhayathra (1990) 
Gajakesariyogam (1990) as Veeraraghavan Nair
Dr. Pasupathy (1990) as Kunjan Nair
Lal Salaam (1990)
Nanma Niranjavan Sreenivasan (1990)
Thooval Sparsham (1990)
Appu (1990) as രമണൻ
Kottayam kunjachan (1990)
Postbox No.27 (1991)
Irikku MD Akathundu (1991)
Swanthwanam (1991)
Ulladakkam (1991)
Nagarathil Samsara Vishayam (1991) as Sundareshan
Mimics Parade (1991) as Nissar
Nayam Vyakthamakkunnu (1991)
Innathe Programme (1991) as Salim
Chanchattam (1991) as Bus Conductor
Aakasha Kottayile Sultan (1991) as Chenthrappinni's Asst
Amaram (1991) as Damodaran
Pandu Pandoru Rajakumari (1992) as Velu
Priyappetta Kukku (1992)
Thiruthalvaadi (1992)
Ootty Pattanam (1992) as Marthanda Varma
Nakshthrakoodaram (1992) as Kuttappan
Manthrikacheppu (1992) as Ustad Seythali
Kasargode Khadarbhai (1992) as Nissar
Chevalier Michael  (1992)
Kallan Kappalil Thanne (1992) as Venkidi
Congratulations Miss Anitha Menon (1992)
First Bell (1992) as Kunjuraman
 Mr & Mrs (1992)
Ezhara Ponnana (1992) as Chinnamani
Ente Ponnu Thampuran (1992) as Kunji Korah
Ennodishtam Koodamo (1992) as Bhagyam's Husband
Ellarum Chollanu (1992) as Arabi
Ardram (1992) as Sathyaseelan
Kizhakkan Pathrose (1992)
Welcome to Kodaikanal (1992) as Hussain
Grihapravesham (1992)
Ponnaaranthottathe Raajaavu (1992)
Maarathon (Aayaraam Gayaaraam) (1992)
Sowbhagyam (1993)
Kulapathi (1993)
Ithu Manjukaalam (1993)
Sakshal Sreeman Chathunni (1993)
Koushalam (1993)
Gandhari (1993)
Uppukandam Brothers (1993)
Varam (1993)
Ponnu Chami (1993)
Jackpot (1993)
Kavadiyattam (1993) as Nariyaparampil Mathukutty
Customs Diary (1993) as Vikraman
Bhagyavan (1993)
Kadal (1994) as Kora
Dollar (1994) as Kuttappayi
Sudhinam (1994) as Shekharan
Sukham Sukhakaram (1994)
Varabhalam (1994)
Poochakkaru Mani Kettum (1994) as Kurup
Bheeshmacharya (1994) as Kannan Nair
Gothram (1994)
Tom & Jerry (1995) as Peter
Thirumanassu (1995) as Vasu
Pai Brothers (1995) as Psychiatrist
Rajakeeyam (1995) as Seethavathi
Mimics Action 500 (1995) as Jollykutty
 Hijack (1995) as Keshu
Maangalyasoothram (1995)
Boxer (1995) as Polachi Rajan
Thumbolikkadappuram (1995)
Mazhavilkkoodaram (1995) as professor
Special Squad (1995) as Murugan
Punnaram (1995) as K.K. Mathai
Manikya Chempazhukka (1995) as Krishnan
Alanchery Thambrakkal (1995) as Purushothaman
Mangalam Veettil Manaseswari Gupta (1995) as Albert
Kidilol Kidilam (1995) as Warrier
Keerthanam (1995)
Kalamasseriyil Kalyanayogam (1995) as 'Gundu' Vasu
Puthukkottayile Puthumanavalan (1995) as Puthukkotta Inspector
Achan Raajaavu Appan Jethaavu (1995)
Padanayakan (1996) as Karimpoocha Kannappan
Harbour (1996) as Aloshi
Kudumbakodathi (1996) as Swami Laxmanandha
Hitler (1996) as Sathyapalan
Sathyabhaamaykkoru Pranayalekhanam (1996)
Mimics Super 1000 (1996)
Pallivaathukkal Thommichan (1996)
Azhakiya Raavanan (1996)
Aayiram Naavulla Ananthan (1996)
Nandagopalante Kusruthikal (1996)
Malayala Masom Chingam Onnu (1996)
Kalyana Sowgandhikam (1996) as Hariprasad
Excuse Me Ethu Collegila (1996)
KL 7-95 Ernakulam North (1996)
Ancharakkalyanam (1997)
Killikurissiyile Kudumbamela (1997)
Moonnu Kodiyum 300 Pavanum (1997)
Kottappurathe Koottukudumbam (1997)
Newspaper Boy (1997) as Phalgunan
Siamese Irattakal (1997)
Hitler Brothers (1997) as Kesavankutty (heroine's (nandini) uncle)
My Dear Kuttichathan part 2 (1997)
Ikkareyanente Manasam (1997) as Sumathi's Uncle
Rakthasaakshikal Sindaabaad (1998)
Gloria Fernandes From U.S.A. (1998)
Panchapandavar (1999) as Luko
Charlie Chaplin (1999)
Auto Brothers (1999)
Parassala Pachan Payyannur Paramu (1999)
Niram (1999)
My Dear Karadi (1999) as Zoo Supervisor
Ezhupunna Tharakan (1999) as Pushkaran
Onnaamvattam Kandappol (1999) as SI Shukkoor
Independence (1999)
Mimics Ghost 2000 (2000)

References

External links

Sainuddin at MSI

Indian male film actors
Male actors from Kochi
1999 deaths
1952 births
Male actors in Malayalam cinema
20th-century Indian male actors
Malayalam comedians